Mukkamala may refer to:
 Mukkamala (actor)
 Mukkamala, East Godavari district
 Mukkamala, West Godavari district